Saili Fe`ao, known also as Willie Fe`ao, (date of birth unknown) is a Tongan former rugby union player who played as hooker. He is the father of the Tongan rugby union international rugby player David Feao.

Career
Fe`ao started his international career playing in the 1995 Rugby World Cup Tonga squad, coached by Fakahau Valu. He played only two matches in the tournament played in Pretoria, being his first cap against France, on 26 May 1995 and against Scotland on 30 May 1995 his last cap.

References

External links

Year of birth missing (living people)
Living people
Tongan rugby union players
Rugby union hookers
Tonga international rugby union players
Tongan expatriates in Australia